John Coltrane with the Red Garland Trio is the third studio album by jazz musician John Coltrane. It was issued in early 1958 on Prestige Records, catalogue 7123. It was recorded at the studio of Rudy Van Gelder in Hackensack, New Jersey.

In 1961 it was reissued as Traneing In, Prestige catalogue 7651, with a different cover design. The album was reissued on compact disc in 2007 as part of the Concord Music Group remastering series by original recording engineer Rudy Van Gelder.

Track listing

Side one

Side two

Personnel
 John Coltrane – tenor saxophone
 Red Garland – piano
 Paul Chambers – bass
 Art Taylor – drums

References 

1958 albums
John Coltrane albums
Prestige Records albums
Albums produced by Bob Weinstock
Albums recorded at Van Gelder Studio